Power/Rangers, or Power Rangers: Unauthorized, is an American superhero fan short film directed and co-written by Joseph Kahn, produced by Adi Shankar and Jil Hardin, and co-written by James Van Der Beek and Dutch Southern. It was released on YouTube and Vimeo on  February 23, 2015.  It is based on the franchise of the same name.

Plot
After the Machine Empire defeats the Power Rangers and destroys the Megazord in battle, Earth's governments negotiate a truce with the Machine Empire and the Power Rangers are disbanded.

Years later, Rocky DeSantos, the second Red Ranger has defected to the Machine Empire, critical of Zordon's use of the Power Rangers as child soldiers, and now sports a prosthetic leg. While interrogating a restrained Kimberly Hart, the former Pink Ranger, about the location of Tommy Oliver, the former Green Ranger, he details the fates of the other Rangers in flashback:

Jason Lee Scott, Rocky's Red Ranger predecessor, was gunned down eight hours after marrying Kimberly, when Farkas Bulkmeier and Eugene Skullovitch seemingly revealed their location to a police force (later dying of a meth overdose and drowning, respectively).
Zack Taylor, the former Black Ranger, was an insatiable action junkie and "Hip Hop Kido" workout instructor who became a Machine Empire enforcer (seen taking down the North Korean Kim and his goons personally) before being murdered by an unknown assassin.
Billy Cranston, the former Blue Ranger, became an openly-gay trillionaire who ended up buying Lockheed Martin and was found dead of an apparent suicide.

Rejecting Rocky's claim that Tommy is hunting down the Rangers, Kimberly tells Rocky that she has not seen him since the funeral of Trini Kwan, the former Yellow Ranger, who died during the treaty negotiations. Rocky acknowledges that he already knew that; she is really being held as bait to lure out Tommy. Tommy arrives and kills the guards, entering into single combat against Rocky in a sword duel. When Rocky gains the upper hand, Kimberly shoots and kills him, but Tommy demands to know who she is, revealing that the real Kimberly died during the final battle years earlier. The fake Kimberly's façade crumbles to reveal Rita Repulsa, who killed all the others: she distracted Jason during the shootout and executed Zack and Billy with gunshots. Rita attempts to lure Tommy into her plan of world domination (noting that she created him) but he denies her, attacking her as the film ends.

Several of the plot points make references to real-life incidents in the original Power Rangers actors' lives:

David Yost, who played Billy, came out as gay after the series ended and was bullied by the original show's producers because of it, which caused him to leave the show and contemplate suicide.
Thuy Trang, who played Trini, died in an automobile accident in 2001; Jason David Frank, who played Tommy, was unable to attend Trang's funeral (as he was burying his then-recently deceased brother at the time).

Cast

Power Rangers
 James Van Der Beek as Rocky, the former Red Ranger
 Katee Sackhoff as Kimberly, the former Pink Ranger
 Russ Bain as Tommy, the former Green Ranger and White Ranger
 Gichi Gamba as Zack, the former Black Ranger
 Yves Bright as Billy, the former Blue Ranger
 Stevin Knight as Jason, the former Red Ranger
 Camilla Lim as Trini, former Yellow Ranger

Others
 Will Yun Lee as General Klank
 Tony Gomez as Bulk
 Matt D'Elia as Skull
 Bree Olson as Divatox
 Amia Miley as Scorpina
 Carla Perez as Rita
 Steffane Melanga as Cestria
 Adi Shankar as Billy's husband

Perez had previously played Rita Repulsa in the original series. She was the only cast member to reprise her role.

Release
The film was released on February 23, 2015. Two versions of the film were released; the version hosted on Vimeo included brief nudity not present in the YouTube version.

Reception by original cast
Members of the original Mighty Morphin Power Rangers  praised it, such as Austin St. John, Amy Jo Johnson and Steve Cardenas. Jason David Frank, the original Green Ranger, criticized the short film, thinking it was too violent and the fact the Power Rangers franchise is still being produced for children. However, he appreciated it on an "inner geek level".

Carla Perez, who played Rita Repulsa in Saban's American-filmed footage for Mighty Morphin Power Rangers and other television iterations (when the character was not portrayed through repurposed Japanese Super Sentai footage in which the character was played by Machiko Soga), made a brief appearance in this film as Rita.

Removal by Saban and restoration
On February 24, 2015, Vimeo chose Power/Rangers as a "Staff Pick". However, a few hours later Vimeo removed the film from its site entirely. On February 25, Vimeo released a statement that the film was removed due to a copyright claim from Saban, the original copyright holders of the Power Rangers franchise. On February 26, Saban had the film removed from YouTube, once again citing copyright claim. On February 27, Power/Rangers was restored to both Vimeo and YouTube.

Possible television follow-up
Adi Shankar has shown interest in making an R-rated re-imagining television series of the original television show.

References

External links

 
 
 
 
 Power/Rangers on Joseph Kahn's website

Power Rangers
Fan films
American short films
Films directed by Joseph Kahn
2010s English-language films
Films released on YouTube